Marek Wesoły (born 4 January 1978) is a Polish former professional road cyclist. He became a professional rider in 2001. In 2006, he became a member of the Polish UCI Continental cycling team, CCC Polsat, now CCC Polsat Polkowice. Wesoły has also been a member of Amore e Vita-Beretta (Italy) (2001, 2003–2004), and Team Skil-Moser (Netherlands) (2005). In 2003, Wesoły rode in the Herald Sun Tour (Australia) for Pelaco (a local sponsor).

Major results
2003
 1st Stage 6 Course de la Solidarité Olympique
2004
 1st  Road race, National Road Championships
2006
 2nd Overall Dookoła Mazowsza
1st Stage 3
 5th Road race, National Road Championships
 7th Overall Course de la Solidarité Olympique
1st Points classification
2007
 1st Overall Dookoła Mazowsza
1st Stages 1, 2b & 4
 1st Stage 4a Bałtyk–Karkonosze Tour
 4th GP Palma
 6th Memoriał Andrzeja Trochanowskiego
2008
 1st Stages 3 & 5 Course de la Solidarité Olympique
 1st Stage 1 Bałtyk–Karkonosze Tour
 1st Stages 2 & 8 Tour de Taiwan
 7th Overall Dookoła Mazowsza
1st Points classification
1st Stage 3

References

External links
Profile (including head shot) of Marek Wesoly, CCC Polsat Polkowice Continental Team 

Polish male cyclists
1978 births
Living people
People from Gostyń
Sportspeople from Greater Poland Voivodeship